Joseph Charles Farman CBE (7 August 193011 May 2013) was a British geophysicist who worked for the British Antarctic Survey. Together with Brian Gardiner and Jon Shanklin, he published the discovery of the ozone hole over Antarctica, having used Dobson ozone spectrophotometers. Their results were first published on 16 May 1985.

Education
He was educated at Norwich School, where he was a prefect in Coke House, and Corpus Christi College, Cambridge, where he gained an undergraduate degree in Natural Sciences.

Awards
He received numerous honours for this discovery, including the Society of Chemical Industry (SCI) Environment Medal, the Chree Medal and Prize, membership of the Global 500 Roll of Honour, and a CBE in the 2000 New Year Honours. For his critical contribution to saving the ozone layer, Farman was a winner of the 2021 Future of Life Award along with Stephen O. Andersen and Susan Solomon. Dr. Jim Hansen, former Director of the NASA Goddard Institute for Space Studies and Director of Columbia University’s Program on Climate Science, Awareness and Solutions said, “In Farman, Solomon and Andersen we see the tremendous impact individuals can have not only on the course of human history, but on the course of our planet’s history. My hope is that others like them will emerge in today’s battle against climate change.” Professor Brian Greene of Columbia University added, “the 2021 Future of Life award winners show how science can work for the betterment of humanity.”

References

External links
Joe Farman on the discovery of the ozone hole.
 Listen to an oral history interview with Joseph Farman - a life story interview recorded for An Oral History of British Science  at the British Library
 Oral history interview transcript with Joseph Farman on 11 October 1999, American Institute of Physics, Niels Bohr Library & Archives - Session I
 Oral history interview transcript with Joseph Farman on 12 October 1999, American Institute of Physics, Niels Bohr Library & Archives - Session II
 Oral history interview transcript with Joseph Farman on 16 March 2009, American Institute of Physics, Niels Bohr Library & Archives
 Oral history interview transcript with Joseph Farman on 16 March 2009 (as part of the Cambridge Seminar Group Session), American Institute of Physics, Niels Bohr Library & Archives

1930 births
2013 deaths
British geophysicists
Commanders of the Order of the British Empire
People educated at Norwich School
Fellows of Corpus Christi College, Cambridge
Oral History of British Science